Bangaon Uttar Assembly constituency is an assembly constituency in North 24 Parganas district in the Indian state of West Bengal. It is reserved for scheduled castes.

Overview
As per orders of the Delimitation Commission, No. 95 Bangaon Uttar Assembly constituency (SC) is composed of the following: Bangaon municipality, and Akaipur, Chhaigheria, Dharma Pukuria, Ganganandapur, Ghatbore, Gopalnagar I and Gopalnagar II gram panchayats of Bangaon community development block.

Bangaon Uttar Assembly constituency (SC) is part of No. 14 Bangaon (Lok Sabha constituency) (SC). Bongaon assembly constituency was earlier part of Barasat (Lok Sabha constituency).

Members of Legislative Assembly

Election results

2021
In the 2021 election, Ashok Kirtania of BJP defeated his nearest rival, Shyamal Roy of AITC.

2016
In the 2016 election, Biswajit Das of Trinamool Congress defeated his nearest rival Sushanta Baowali of All India Forward Bloc.

2011

In the 2011 election, Biswajit Das of Trinamool Congress defeated his nearest rival Dr. Biswajit Biswas of CPI(M).

1977-2009 Bongaon assembly seat
In the 2009 bye-election caused by the election of sitting MLA, Saugata Roy  to the Lok Sabha from Dum Dum, Gopal Seth of All India Trinamool Congress won the Bangaon seat.

In the 2006 bye-election caused by the death of the sitting MLA, Bhupen Seth, Saugato Roy of Trinamool Congress defeated Pankaj Ghosh of CPI(M).

In the 2006 state assembly elections, Bhupendranath Seth of  Trinamool Congress won the Bongaon assembly seat defeating his nearest rival Pankaj Ghosh of CPI(M). Contests in most years were multi cornered but only winners and runners are being mentioned. Pankaj Ghosh of CPI(M) defeated Bhupendranath Seth, Independent and Congress respectively) in 2001 and 1996. Bhupendranath Seth of Congress defeated Ranajit Mitra of CPI(M) in 1991. Ranajit Mitra of CPI(M) defeated Bhupendranath Seth of Congress in 1987. Bhupendranath Seth of Congress defeated Ranajit Mitra of CPI(M) in 1982. Ranajit Mitra of CPI(M) defeated Bhupendranath Seth of Congress in 1977.

1951-1972 Bongaon assembly seat
Ajit Kumar Ganguly of CPI won in 1972, 1971 and 1969. K.Bhowmick of Congress won in 1967. Jiban Ratan Dhar of Congress won in 1962. In 1957, Bongaon was a joint seat. Ajit Kumar Ganguly of CPI and Manindra Bhusan Biswas of Congress won in 1957. Jiban Ratan Dhar of Congress won in 1951.

References

Assembly constituencies of West Bengal
Politics of North 24 Parganas district